Ek Daav Bhutacha is a Marathi horror-comedy film released in India in 1982.

Plot
The plot revolves around a school master, portrayed by Dilip Prabhavalkar. He is a simple and honest teacher who is posted to teach in a school in a small village of rural India. Within a short time he runs into trouble with the village sarpanch (local chief) for having punished his son in class. More trouble soon follows when a dance troupe (or a tamasha) comes into the village. In an effort to please the lead dancer, the sarpanch has the teacher's house emptied and gives it the dancing troupe to occupy.

Now homeless, the teacher is forced to seek shelter in the ruins of an old building on the outskirts of the village. Here he meets the ghost (or bhoot) of a Maratha soldier, portrayed by Ashok Saraf. Scared at first, the teacher tries to run away. But the ghost soon assures him that he means no harm.

The ghost narrates his story to the teacher. He tells him that he was a soldier in the Maratha army who was cursed for having separated two lovers. Since then he has waited for a chance to seek redemption. He is convinced that by helping the teacher with his trouble, somehow he may be able to reverse his curse. Not entirely convinced, the teacher agrees all the same.

The ghost first scares the troupe staying in the teacher's house by playing their instruments. Since the teacher is the only one who can see the ghost, the troupe members are terrified and run away. Similar incidents follow that although embarrass the teacher, but end up solving the teachers problems. In the course, the teacher meets a village girl, portrayed by Ranjana. The ghost intervenes to make her fall in love with the teacher.

The village sarpanch plays the villain several times, only to be thwarted by the ghost. Finally all ends well when the teacher decides to marry his beloved. Having succeeded in getting two people to fall in love, the ghost is released from his curse and finally gets redemption. The teacher is sorry to see his old friend go. However, the ghost assures him that he will be back - as their child.

Cast
Dilip Prabhavalkar
Ashok Saraf
Ranjana
Mohan Kothiwan
Ram Nagarkar
Sulochana Latkar
Mohan Joshi
Raghavendra Kadkol
Johny Lever

References

External links

1980s Marathi-language films